San José de Quero District is one of fifteen districts of the Concepción Province in Peru.

Other mountains are listed below:

References